Scared to Get Happy: A Story of Indie-Pop 1980–1989 is a five-disc compilation album that features 134 songs from indie pop artists from the 1980s. It was released in June 2013 by Cherry Red Records.

Cherry Red Records explained the album is inspired by Lenny Kaye's album Nuggets: Original Artyfacts from the First Psychedelic Era, 1965–1968.

Track listing

References

2013 compilation albums
Cherry Red Records compilation albums
Indie pop compilation albums